Saguenay may refer to:

Places in Canada
Saguenay, Quebec, a city
Saguenay River, a major river in Quebec
Saguenay–Lac-Saint-Jean, the region of the Saguenay
Le Fjord-du-Saguenay Regional County Municipality (The Saguenay Fjord), Regional County Municipality in Quebec
Le Saguenay-et-son-Fjord, a statistical area
Petit-Saguenay, Quebec, a municipality in Quebec
Saguenay (provincial electoral district), a former Quebec provincial electoral district
Chicoutimi-Saguenay, a former Quebec provincial electoral district
Charlevoix-Saguenay, a former Quebec provincial electoral district
Saguenay County, Quebec, a historical county in Quebec
Chicoutimi—Saguenay, a defunct federal electoral district in Quebec
Charlevoix—Saguenay, a defunct federal electoral district in Quebec
Saguenay–St. Lawrence Marine Park, a National Marine Conservation Area
Zec de la Rivière-Petit-Saguenay, a zone d'exploitation contrôlée (controlled harvesting zone) in Quebec
Zec de la Rivière-Saint-Jean-du-Saguenay, a zone d'exploitation contrôlée (controlled harvesting zone) in Québec

Geology
Saguenay Graben, a geologic structure in Quebec enclosing the Saguenay River.

Other uses
Saguenay (ship), a Canadian steamship
Saguenay (train), a passenger train in Quebec, Canada
Saguenay flood, a series of flash floods that hit the Saguenay-Lac-Saint-Jean region of Quebec, Canada in July 1996
Saguenay French, a dialect of Quebec French
Saguenay Herald, an officer of arms at the Canadian Heraldic Authority
HMCS Saguenay, two ships that served the Royal Canadian Navy
Kingdom of Saguenay, an Iroquoian legend